USS D-3 (SS-19) was a D-class submarine built for the United States Navy in the first decade of the 20th century. It was the first submarine to make an over ocean voyage under its own power.

Description
The D-class submarines were enlarged versions of the preceding C class, the first American submarines armed with four torpedo tubes. They displaced  on the surface and  submerged. The D-class boats had a crew of 1 officer and 14 enlisted men.

For surface running, they were powered by two  gasoline engines, each driving one propeller shaft. When submerged each propeller was driven by a  electric motor. They could reach  on the surface and  underwater.

The boats were armed with four 18-inch (450 mm)  torpedo tubes in the bow. They did not carry reloads for them.

Career and construction

D-3 was laid down by Fore River Shipbuilding Company in Quincy, Massachusetts, under a subcontract from Electric Boat Company of Groton, Connecticut, as Salmon, making her the first ship of the United States Navy to be named for the salmon. Salmon was launched on 12 March 1910 sponsored by Eunice Fitzgerald, the daughter of Boston Mayor John F. Fitzgerald.

In July 1910, captained by Electric Boat Company executive and former naval officer Gregory C. Davison, she journeyed from Massachusetts to Bermuda and returned. Travelling about 1,500 miles, it was the first over-sea trip made by a submarine under its own power.

Service history
Commissioned on 8 September 1910 with Lieutenant David A. Weaver in command, the new submarine joined the Atlantic Torpedo Fleet at Newport, Rhode Island. She was renamed D-3 on 17 November 1911. The torpedo fleet was active along the East Coast and made a cruise to the Caribbean Sea from 17 October 1912 – 20 January 1913 after which D-3 remained to serve with the forces operating in Mexican waters following the occupation of Veracruz. She rejoined the flotilla at Norfolk, Virginia on 16 June 1914 and with them visited Washington, DC, from 17–22 July, before returning to their homeport on 24 July. From 21 September 1917, D-3 served as flagship of Submarine Division 2 (SubDiv 2). She trained aspiring submariners at Newport and New London, Connecticut, until placed in commission, in reserve on 5 September 1919.

She was placed in ordinary on 15 July 1921. Towed into Philadelphia Navy Yard on 20 March 1922, D-3 was decommissioned the same day and sold on 31 July.

Notes

References

External links

United States D-class submarines
World War I submarines of the United States
Ships built in Quincy, Massachusetts
1910 ships